Polar Bear is the eponymous third album by Sebastian Rochford's British jazz band, Polar Bear.

Background
According to the band, they spent "a lot of time" recording Polar Bear; Seb Rochford stating that he wanted the album "to have the saxes not so much soloing, but more interacting with (Leafcutter) John, and it took a while for everyone to get their heads round improvising in that way".

The album was initially released on Tin Angel in 2008, but was re-issued by The Leaf Label in 2014.

Critical reception

On the Metacritic website, which aggregates reviews from critics and assigns a normalised rating out of 100, Peepers received a score of 72, based on 1 mixed and 3 positive reviews. Drowned In Sound praised the album's "seamless motion and playful interplay" and  "sheer musical pleasure", awarding it 8/10. The BBC called it a "triumph" in their review, calling Polar Bear "a fine record". The Guardian write that Rochford is a "proper jazz composer, whose themes are spare, colourful and strong enough to frame and support extensive improvisation from his talented crew and guests" and call the album "brilliant". The Observer are less impressed, writing that "this is a band running out of ideas", calling Polar Bear "good in small doses". Ultimately, the album did not receive the same press as the previous album, Held On The Tips Of Fingers, which had gained extra media attention after being shortlisted for a Mercury Music Prize.

Track listing

Personnel

Polar Bear
 Pete Wareham – tenor saxophone
 Mark Lockheart – tenor saxophone
 Sebastian Rochford – drums, bass (13)
 Tom Herbert – double bass, drums (13)
 Leafcutter John –  electronics, mandolin, kalimba, glass, bowed cymbal, samples and balloon

Additional musicians
 Julia Biel – vocals (7 and 8)
 Ben Davis – cello (8)
 Amanda Drummond – viola (12)
 Brian Edwards – tenor saxophone (7)
 Ingrid Laubrock – tenor saxophone (11)

References 

2008 albums
The Leaf Label albums
Polar Bear (British band) albums